The Monegasque ambassador in Washington, D. C. is the official representative of Prince Albert II and the Princely Government of Monaco to the Government of the United States.

List of representatives

References 

 
Monaco
United States